Christopher Ward (born August 3, 1976) is an American politician serving as a member of the California Assembly for the 78th district. Prior to his election to the assembly, Ward served as a member of the San Diego City Council, representing the Third Council District. He is a Democrat.

Early life and education 
Ward was born in Germany in 1976. He earned a Bachelor of Arts degree at Johns Hopkins University and a Master in Public Policy and Urban Planning at the Harvard Kennedy School.

Career 
He worked as an Environmental Planner at the firm EDAW, working with local government to develop land use plans and conduct environmental review, and as a Researcher at the Ludwig Cancer Research at the University of California, San Diego. He then served as the chief of staff to State Senator Marty Block.

Chris is an active member of the San Diego chapter of the Truman National Security Project.

San Diego City Council

Elections 

In 2016, Ward ran for an open seat on the San Diego City Council representing District 3. District 3 includes the neighborhoods of Balboa Park, Bankers Hill/Park West, Downtown San Diego, Golden Hill, Hillcrest, Little Italy, Mission Hills, Normal Heights, North Park, Old Town, and University Heights. Incumbent council member Todd Gloria ran for San Diego Mayor. Ward was elected in the June primary with a majority of the vote.

Tenure 
As a councilmember, Ward worked to identify measures that will significantly reduce San Diego's overall homeless population. These included three temporary shelters to house 700 individuals, an additional storage facility to serve 500 clients, and a proposed centralized homeless navigation center. In July 2017, the City Council unanimously approved an Equal Pay Ordinance that was proposed by Ward. The ordinance requires companies that do business with the city to pay their employees equally regardless of gender or race.

In January 2019, the City Council approved a measure proposed by Ward that bans, for environmental reasons, the use of polystyrene (Styrofoam) for most retail uses including food service, egg cartons, and coolers. The ordinance also stipulates that single-use plastic items such as straws and eating utensils be available only on request. According to Ward, San Diego is the largest city in California to take this action.

Committee assignments 
 Active Transportation and Infrastructure Committee (Vice Chair)
 Economic Development and Intergovernmental Relations Committee (Chair)
 Land Use and Housing Committee (Vice Chair)
 Rules Committee

California State Assembly

2020 California State Assembly
On January 24, 2019, Ward announced that he would be a candidate for the California State Assembly in district 78 to succeed Assemblyman Todd Gloria, who was running for mayor of San Diego. Ward received the most votes and was elected to the Assembly in 2020.

2022 California State Assembly 

Ward is running for reelection in 2022.

Tenure 
Ward was involved in gun violence reduction legislation that was signed into law in 2022 that enables lawsuits against gun manufacturers and retailers for negligence. He authored another bill that was signed into law in 2022 that changes procedures for altering gender and sex identifiers on government documents.

Personal life
Ward and his partner Thom are homeowners in University Heights, where they live with their two children.

References

External links
 Official website
 Join California Chris Ward

1976 births
21st-century American politicians
21st-century LGBT people
American LGBT city council members
Democratic Party members of the California State Assembly
Gay politicians
Harvard Kennedy School alumni
Johns Hopkins University alumni
LGBT state legislators in California
Living people
San Diego City Council members